Bomben auf Monte Carlo is a 1930 German comedy novel by Fritz Reck-Malleczewen.

Description

In the novel, the penniless captain of a vessel puts into Monte Carlo, hoping to raise money at the gaming tables to pay his crew. While there he becomes entangled with a monarch in disguise.

Film adaptations
The story has been made into four films at the time of writing. In 1931 the German film Bombs on Monte Carlo was made, with a French-language version Captain Craddock and an English-language version Monte Carlo Madness made at the same time. 

In 1960 a fourth film version was made entitled Bombs on Monte Carlo and directed by Georg Jacoby.

1930 German novels
German comedy novels
Novels set in Monaco
German novels adapted into films